Unorthodox is the second full-length studio album by the Swedish death metal band Edge of Sanity.  It was recorded in between December 1991 and January 1992 with Tomas Skogsberg and released by Black Mark on July 8, 1992.

Dan Swanö has claimed that this is his favorite Edge of Sanity album, and even went as far as to call it "perfect". Though primarily death metal, some tracks on this album foreshadow the shift to more melodic sounds which would take shape on 1993's "The Spectral Sorrows". This is also the first Edge of Sanity album (one of the first death metal albums) to feature clean vocals, which appear briefly in the track "Enigma".

Track listing

Personnel
Edge of Sanity
 Dan Swanö − Vocals, Piano
 Andreas Axelsson − Guitars
 Sami Nerberg − Guitars
 Anders Lindberg − Bass
 Benny Larsson − Drums, Percussion

Guest musicians
 Yasmina Molero - Additional Vocals on "Enigma"
 Anders Mareby − Classical Guitar, Cello (ex-Brejn Dedd)

Production
 Mattias Axelsson - Photography
 Bart Meganck - Cover art
 Lasse Hoile - Logo art
 Gunnar Swanö - Logo art
 Boss - Executive producer
 Rex Gisslén - Engineering, Mixing
 Dread - Logo art concept
 Dan Swanö - Mixing
 Dogger Tralce - Drawing

References

Edge of Sanity albums
1992 albums